Shi Jian (born January 11, 1988 in Changzhou) is a Chinese sailor.  He competed at the 2012 Summer Olympics in the Men's Laser class finishing in 43rd.

References

Living people
Olympic sailors of China
Chinese male sailors (sport)
Sailors at the 2012 Summer Olympics – Laser
Sportspeople from Jiangsu
1988 births
Sailors at the 2014 Asian Games
Asian Games competitors for China
21st-century Chinese people